The Pacific-Union Club is a social club located at 1000 California Street in San Francisco, California, at the top of Nob Hill. It is considered to be the most elite club of the West Coast, and one of the most elite clubs in the United States, along with the Knickerbocker Club in New York, the Metropolitan Club in Washington D.C., and the Somerset Club in Boston. 

It was founded in 1889, as a merger of two earlier clubs: the Pacific Club (founded 1852) and the Union Club (founded 1854).
The clubhouse was built as the home for silver magnate James Clair Flood. The former Flood Mansion is located in the Nob Hill neighborhood. It was designed by Willis Polk. It is considered the first brownstone constructed west of the Mississippi River. Along with the Fairmont Hotel across the street, it was the only structure in the area to survive the San Francisco earthquake and fire of 1906.

The club figured prominently in the history of the west coast of the United States.

Prominent members 

Many notable citizens have been Pacific-Union Club members, including:

 John Barneson, founder of General Petroleum Corporation, General Pipe Line Company
 Riley P. Bechtel, CEO, Bechtel Corporation
 Stephen Bechtel Jr., former CEO, Bechtel Corporation
 Warren A. Bechtel, founder of Bechtel Corporation
 Benjamin Biaggini, former president and CEO, Southern Pacific Railroad
 William Lane Booker, British diplomat
 Benjamin Dillingham
 William Henry Draper III, businessman
 Paul B. Fay Jr., (deceased) former Undersecretary of the Navy and PT squadron mate  of John F. Kennedy
 Tirey L. Ford, former California Attorney General
 Henry F. Grady, first US Ambassador to India; Dean of the Commerce Department at the University of California, Berkeley; President of American President Lines
 Walter A. Haas Jr., CEO (1958–1976) and chairman (1970–1981) of Levi Strauss & Co
 Randolph Apperson Hearst
 William Randolph Hearst Jr.
 William Randolph Hearst III
 William Redington Hewlett, co-founder of Hewlett-Packard
 Henry J. Kaiser, engineer and founder of Kaiser Family Foundation
 William S. Mailliard
 Robert McNamara, former U.S. Secretary of Defense
 David Packard, co-founder of Hewlett-Packard and former U.S. Deputy Secretary of Defense
 R. A. F. Penrose Jr., prominent geologist
 Donald J. Russell, former president, Southern Pacific Railroad
 Charles R. Schwab, founder of Charles Schwab Corporation
 Caspar Weinberger, former U.S. Secretary of Defense
 Plácido Vega y Daza, former General and Governor of the Mexican state Sinaloa. He descended directly from Christopher Columbus' great-great grandson, the Admiral and 3rd Duke of Veragua. General Vega y Daza also became a vice-president of the Pacific Union Club of San Francisco

Pacific Union Club Punch
Pacific Union Club Punch is a drink named after the Pacific-Union Club in William "Cocktail" Boothby's 1908 work The World's Drinks And How To Mix Them with the recipe:
For a party of ten. Into a large punch-bowl place ten tablespoonfuls of bar sugar and ten tablespoonfuls of freshly squeezed lime or lemon juice. Add two jiggers of Curaçao and dissolve the whole in about a quart of effervescent water. Add two quarts of champagne and one bottle of good cognac. Stir thoroughly, ice, decorate and serve in thin glassware.

See also
 List of American gentlemen's clubs

References

Clubs and societies in California
Gentlemen's clubs in California
Buildings and structures in San Francisco
Clubhouses in California
Culture of San Francisco
Landmarks in San Francisco
Nob Hill, San Francisco
Organizations based in San Francisco
Organizations established in 1889
1889 establishments in California
Neoclassical architecture in California